The butter mountain is a supply surplus of butter produced in the European Union because of government interventionism that began in the 1970s. The size of the surplus changed significantly over time and mostly disappeared by 2017, which has led to shortages. Other surpluses were described as beef mountains, milk lakes, wine lakes and grain mountains.

Excesses existed because the agricultural policies were designed to stabilize prices for farmers and consumers and to ensure that there was enough produce at all times, but production varied from year to year, so in most years there was an excess. Excesses were often sold off cheaply either within the EU or to other markets.

History 
Agricultural underproduction in the 1950s led to a series of market interventions, including the Common Agricultural Policy. Governments subsidized milk production by a guaranteed minimum intervention price for dairy products. This led to a surge in the production of grain, milk, butter and related products until production exceeded demand in the late 1970s, resulting in a glut. Milk production in West Germany alone increased from 75 million tonnes in 1960 to nearly 100 million tonnes by 1979. To combat the overproduction, governments introduced milk quotas, which were governed by the Common Agricultural Policy. 

In the following decades, production continued to outstrip demand, and the European governments and later the European Union would purchase tonnes of the surplus agricultural goods, creating so-called "milk lakes" and "butter" or "beef mountains".

"Christmas butter" 
The packages were labelled as being the product of intervention stockpiles and were specifically intended to reduce that oversupply.

Decline  
In 2003, it was reported that the EU warehoused 194,000 tonnes of powdered milk and 223,000 tonnes of butter. In 2007, rising demand and planned reforms were forecast to eliminate the oversupply of milk and butter eventually. By 2009, the butter mountain had returned because of a steep decline in the price of dairy products. In 2017, it was reported that European butter stockpiles had largely disappeared because of increased demand and dwindling production, which caused shortages and rising prices.

See also 

 Government cheese
 Wine lake

References 

Butter
Economy of the European Union
European Union and agriculture